Elton Aparecido Crepaldi Morelato (born August 13, 1988 in São Carlos, Brazil) is a professional footballer who most recently played for Brazilian Série B side ASA de Arapiraca, where he played as a striker.

External links
 

1988 births
Living people
Brazilian footballers
Brazilian expatriate footballers
Moroka Swallows F.C. players
Hibernians F.C. players
Agremiação Sportiva Arapiraquense players
Association football forwards